Linn Township may refer to:

Linn Township, Woodford County, Illinois
Linn Township, Cedar County, Iowa
Linn Township, Dallas County, Iowa
Linn Township, Washington County, Kansas, in Washington County, Kansas
Linn Township, Audrain County, Missouri
Linn Township, Cedar County, Missouri
Linn Township, Dent County, Missouri
Linn Township, Moniteau County, Missouri
Linn Township, Osage County, Missouri
Linn Township, Hand County, South Dakota, in Hand County, South Dakota

Township name disambiguation pages